Kafarakab (also spelled Kfarakab or Kfar Akab and pronounced "Kfara-ab" in Arabic) is the francophone spelling of the name of a village in the mountains of Lebanon. In Arabic, it means the home (Kfar: كفر) of the hawk (Akab: عقاب). The village, which is located in the Matn District of the Mount Lebanon Governorate, is of particular significance because it is one of the various historic points of origin of the Maalouf family. It was founded c. 1560 AD when three families of the Maalouf clan, living at the time across the valley in the village of Mhaydse, received permission from the ruling emir to establish the village. The family history is traced back to the beginnings of Christianity in the Middle East beginning with the Ghassanid tribe, which converted to Christianity nearly 2,000 years ago. The family name is now widespread worldwide.

The village is of no great size, consisting of only a few dozen old homes built on terraced mountainsides lined with grape vineyards and many varieties of fruit trees. The population swells during the summer as people leave the heat of the Lebanese coastline for the freshness of the mountains. Its weather is moderate, with temperatures ranging near  in the summer, and near  in the winter season. Snowfall is common in the winter, with snow accumulations reaching .

The population follows the Christian faith, divided between Antiochian Eastern-Orthodox, Antiochian Oriental-Orthodox and Melkite. The local St. Mary church is separated into two halves, one for each faith. The scenic view is perhaps the most notable aspect of this red terra cotta rooftop cluster - including a view of the snow-capped Lebanon mountains to the east, and the Mediterranean sea and the city of Beirut to the west. The village sits at an elevation about  just below the village of Baskinta and the towering Mount Sannine. Its distance to Beirut is approximately 40 km, or approximately 1 hour of driving. Its GPS coordinates are 

From Kfarakab, the Maalouf clan migrated within Lebanon to Zahlé and Niha in the Bekaa Valley where it became one of the most prominent families in these villages. The migration continued in the late 1800s and 1900s to Brazil, the United States of America and Canada where the family prospered and has become known in many spheres of influence.

Notable residents
Rony Aprat, Top model since 2019, world renowned philanthropist, political key figure, has built the first food court in kfaraab and in the region.
Fady Maalouf, German singer, born in Zahlé (lives now in Berlin)
Nassim Maalouf, classical trumpeter, born in Kafarakab
Nahim Malouf Abraham (1885-1965), businessman and community builder in Canadian, Texas

External links
Kfar Aaqab, Localiban
Kfarakab site

Populated places in the Matn District
Eastern Orthodox Christian communities in Lebanon
Melkite Christian communities in Lebanon